Henry Sharpe Higginbotham, better known as Shorpy Higginbotham (November 23, 1896 — January 25, 1928) was a laborer in an Alabama coal mine in the early twentieth century. He served in World War I before returning to the mines, where he was killed by a falling rock in 1928.  Higginbotham was the subject of a series of photographs by Lewis Hine that showed him as a boy working in the dangerous environment of a coal mine.  He is the namesake of the historical photography blog Shorpy.com, where he has become a symbol of child labor in the United States.

References

Child labour
Child labor in the United States
1896 births
1928 deaths